A plural district was a district in the United States House of Representatives that was represented by more than one member. States using this method elected multiple members from some of their geographically defined districts.  They did so on a single ballot (block voting) or on separate concurrent ballots for each seat (conducting multiple plurality elections).  In more modern terms, for less ambiguity, such a district is termed a multi-member district (such as many of those of the New Hampshire House of Representatives, abroad and in other bodies).

Such greater than one-member district magnitude was used to give more populous counties or established Congressional Districts fair representation without redistricting (specifically, dividing them). It was rare before 1805 but notably applied to many Congressional Districts of New York and Pennsylvania until federally (nationally) prohibited by the 1842 Apportionment Bill and consequent locally implementing legislation.

Plural district usage
This is a table of every instance of the use of plural districts in the United States Congress

See also
Theory and principles
 Electoral district#District magnitude, the number of members per district

Compatible with
 Block voting, a vote/ballot for multiple members to be returned, usually on a first-past-the-post plurality basis
 First-past-the-post, a vote/ballot for one member to be returned, on a plurality basis
Multiple ballots, one per designated seat, using system above
 Proportional representation, any voting system which seeks to result in representation in proportion to the number of respective votes cast in an election, or multi-member district, overall
 General ticket – the return of a single winning party or team's candidates for a set of electoral districts, or for each multi-member district which uses it
 Representation at-large – a representative/territory being undivided for every purpose as to a representative body.  The most populous at large districts/regions tend to be multi-member

Sources

External links
U.S. House of Representatives: House History

United States congressional districts
Electoral systems